DIY Space for London was a volunteer-run social centre, music venue, rehearsal space, and creative hub formerly located at 96-108 Ormside Street in South Bermondsey, London.

History
The space opened in September 2015 after the founding collective at first struggled for two years to find a suitable location.

The collective, started in 2012, raised £20,000 through benefit gigs, events, and community grants to secure a five year lease.

Inspired by other social centres such as 1 in 12 Club in Bradford, their goal was to, "create a sustainable, collectively run space to put gigs on, hold meetings and building a communal infrastructure" that would be "run by its members and open for anyone to get involved in." It had ten interlinked volunteer collectives taking care of running the space.

Whether volunteering or attending, the space was both functionally and legally a members' club. As of June 2017 this was over 5000 members.

Volunteers of the space hosted a radio show showcasing the type of musicians to appear there on NTS Radio between 2016 and 2017.

From 2016 to 2019 the space was the venue for First Timers, a yearly series of workshops culminating in a two day festival that encourages "new faces and voices in bands", in order to "do something about the lack of diversity in the music community".

Over the weekend of 2-4 June 2017, DIY Diaspora Punx (a collective started by Stephanie Phillips of Big Joanie, and also containing other London musicians such as Rachel Aggs) put on the first Decolonise Fest at DIY Space for London. Decolonise Fest is the UK's first music festival created by and for people of colour. The second edition of the festival (again mostly held at DIY Space) occurred from 22 to 24 June 2018, with a third over 29 to 30 June 2019.

On 12 June 2020 the collective announced due to temporary closures enforced due to the COVID-19 pandemic they had been unable to renew their lease on their current premises and would be seeking a new location.

Notable performers
Artists to have performed at the venue have included:

References

Music venues in London
Nightclubs in London
Social centres in the United Kingdom
Underground punk scene in the United Kingdom
2015 establishments in the United Kingdom